The Four Denominations District is an area of the Old Town in Wrocław, Poland, between Kazimierza Wielkiego, Sw. Antoniego, Pawła Włodkowica and Sw. Mikolaja streets. The name has been used since 1995 on the initiative of (Catholic, Orthodox, and Protestant) Christian clergy  together with Jerzy Kichler, an activist from the Polish Jewish community.

Though called a district, the area is not and has never been an actual administrative district of Wrocław.

Sights and culture
The area has four places of worship for different denominations in close proximity. These are:

 The  
 The 
 The 
 The White Stork Synagogue

The faithful of four denominations organize common charity events, educational meetings for children, and ecumenical prayers to bring closer the cultural and religious diversity of the city. It is one of the city's tourist attractions. 

Other notable places in the neighborhood include the Cristal Planet sculpture, open-air gallery of neon signs, New Horizons movie theater (Wratislavia Tower), the Royal Palace near the Protestant church, the Wrocław Jewish Community building, the Small Synagogue, and historical passages. The area is also one of the spaces of BWA Wrocław Gallery, the location of Galeria ArtBrut, TYC ART Gallery, GG Gallery & Atelier, Surowiec Club, TIFF Festival, and many other events.

In order to emphasize the uniqueness of this area, the Wrocław Development Office came up with an idea to develop it and to create a cultural path of four temples, which will connect all the temples and will become the main element identifying this part of the Old Town.

See also
 Wrocław Old Town
 Nadodrze

References

Arts districts
Culture in Wrocław
 
Jews and Judaism in Wrocław
Judaism in Poland
Religion in Wrocław